Themes from Calmi Cuori Appassionati is a soundtrack album by Irish singer, songwriter and musician Enya, released in Japan on 30 October 2001 by WEA International. It is compiled of previously released songs recorded between 1986 and 2000 that were used for the soundtrack to the 2001 Japanese romantic film Calmi Cuori Appassionati.

Effectively a "greatest hits" collection, given its inclusion of most of Enya's best-known recordings, the album entered the Japanese album chart at number two, and become Enya's second album after Paint the Sky with Stars – The Very Best of Enya (1997) to sell one million copies in the country, despite the fact many of the tracks on this release were also included on Paint the Sky with Stars.

Track listing

Charts

Certifications

Release history

References 

Enya compilation albums
2001 soundtrack albums